Nikola Bilyk (born 28 November 1996) is an Austrian handball player for THW Kiel and the Austria men's national handball team.

References

External links

1996 births
Living people
Austrian male handball players
Expatriate handball players
THW Kiel players
Handball-Bundesliga players
Sportspeople from Tunis
Austrian people of Ukrainian descent
Austrian expatriate sportspeople in Germany
Sportspeople from Vienna